Knefastia funiculata is a species of sea snail, a marine gastropod mollusk in the family Pseudomelatomidae, the turrids and allies.

Description
The length of the shell varies between 20 mm and 60 mm.

Distribution
This marine species occurs off Pacific Mexico to Panama

References

 Kiener, L. C. "Genre Pleurotome (Pleurotoma Lam.)." Genre (1839): 1.
 B. Landau and C. Marques da Silva. 2010. Early Pliocene gastropods of Cubagua, Venezuela: Taxonomy, palaeobiogeography and ecostratigraphy. Palaeontos 19:1-221

External links
 MNHN, Paris : syntype
 
 Gastropods.com: Knefastia funiculata

funiculata
Gastropods described in 1840